Belgium was represented by Jacques Zegers, with the song "Avanti la vie", at the 1984 Eurovision Song Contest, which took place on 5 May in Luxembourg City. Zegers was the winner of the Belgian national final for the contest, held on 2 March.

Before Eurovision

Eurosong 
French-language broadcaster RTBF was in charge of the selection of the Belgian entry for the 1984 Contest. The final was held at the RTBF studios in Brussels with ten songs participating. Voting was by a 50/50 split between an expert jury and 500 randomly chosen TV viewers. Only the top four placings were announced, with "Avanti la vie" being declared the winner.

Marianne Croix would go on to the German semi-final of 1987 with the song "Ich fliege zu dir"

At Eurovision 
On the night of the final Zegers performed 8th in the running order, following Cyprus and preceding Ireland. At the close of the voting "Avanti la vie" had received 70 points from 11 countries (including maximum 12s from France and Luxembourg), placing Belgium joint fifth (with Italy) of the 19 competing entries. The Belgian jury awarded its 12 points to Ireland.

Voting

References

External links
 Belgian selection 1984

1984
Countries in the Eurovision Song Contest 1984
Eurovision